Lieben may refer to:

 Libeň, Prague, Czech Republich
 Adolf Lieben (1836–1914), Austrian Jewish chemist 
 Robert von Lieben, Austrian Jewish physicist
 Palais Lieben-Auspitz, a ring road in Vienna, Austria

See also